Sierra Madre Villa station is a light rail station on the L Line of the Los Angeles Metro Rail system. It is located in the median of Interstate 210 (Foothill Freeway), at Sierra Madre Villa Avenue, after which the station is named, in Pasadena, California. The light rail station opened on July 26, 2003, as the northern terminus of the original Gold Line, then known as the "Pasadena Metro Blue Line" project. This station and all the other original and Foothill Extension stations will be part of the A Line upon completion of the Regional Connector project in 2023.

The station has a 965 space, five-floor parking garage, accessed from Sierra Madre Villa Avenue and North Halstead Street. The first floor of the parking garage has a multi-bay bus plaza, and the fourth floor has the train platform access, with faregates, ticket vending machines and a pedestrian bridge, which passes over the westbound lanes of the Foothill Freeway.

Sierra Madre Villa was the L Line's northern terminus from 2003 until 2016. Service on the first phase of the Foothill Extension began on March 5, 2016, which extended the line to APU/Citrus College station.

The station structure was designed by artist Tony Gleaton and features large photo portraits suspended above the platform access stairways. The adjacent 965-space parking structure was designed by artist Beth Thielen, using a theme of "nature and movement". The station, under naming schemes, is named for Sierra Madre Villa Avenue rather than the nearby city of Sierra Madre, although the major thoroughfare leads to Sierra Madre.

Station layout

Hours and frequency

Connections 
, the following connections are available:
 Foothill Transit: 
 Pasadena Transit: 31, 32, 40, 60

Notable places nearby 
The station is within walking distance of the following notable places:
 A Noise Within Theater
 Kaiser Permanente Pasadena Medical Offices
 Hastings Ranch Plaza
 Hastings Village Shopping Center
 Pasadena City College Foothill campus

References

External links 

L Line (Los Angeles Metro) stations
Transportation in Pasadena, California
Sierra Madre, California
Railway stations in the United States opened in 2003
2003 establishments in California